The New Zealand men's national squash team represents New Zealand in international squash team competitions, and is governed by Squash New Zealand.

Since 1967, New Zealand has participated in three finals of the World Squash Team Open.

Current team
 Paul Coll
 Campbell Grayson
 Martin Knight
 Evan Williams

Results

World Team Squash Championships

See also 
 Squash New Zealand
 World Team Squash Championships
 New Zealand women's national squash team

References

External links 
 New Zealand

Squash teams
Men's national squash teams
Squash
Squash in New Zealand
Men's sport in New Zealand